Our Personal Favorite World Famous Hits is a compilation album, from rock band Daniel Amos, released in 1998 on KMG Records.

Track listing
 "Walls of Doubt" [from Alarma!] 1981
 "Alarma!" [from Alarma!] 1981
 "Darn Floor - Big Bite" [from Darn Floor - Big Bite] 1987
 "Broken Ladders" [from Bibleland] 1994
 "I'll Get Over It" [from Bibleland] 1994
 "If You Want To" [from Kalhoun] 1991
 "The Pool" [from Fearful Symmetry] 1986
 "Mall (All Over The World)" [from Doppelganger] 1983
 "I Love You #19" [from Live Bootleg '82] 1982
 "Hound Of Heaven" [from Live Bootleg '82] 1982
 "Twilight Love" [Live] Unreleased 1979
 "Grace Is The Smell of Rain" [from Motor Cycle] 1993
 "Noelle" [from Motor Cycle] 1993
 "When Everyone Wore Hats" [from Songs of the Heart] 1995
 "Sanctuary" [from Vox Humana] 1984
 "Soon" [from The Revelation] 1986
 "Father's Arms" [from Shotgun Angel] 1977
 "Ain't Gonna Fight It" [from Maranatha 5] 1975

Personnel
 Terry Scott Taylor: Vocals, Guitars
 Jerry Chamberlain: Guitars, Vocals
 Ed McTaggart: Drums
 Tim Chandler: Bass
 Greg Flesch: Guitars
 Marty Dieckmeyer: Bass
 Mark Cook: Keyboards, Vocals
 Rob Watson: Keyboards
 Alex MacDougall: Percussion

Production
 Compiled by Tom Gulotta and Terry Taylor
 Artwork by Douglas TenNapel
 Layout by Tom Gulotta

1998 compilation albums
Daniel Amos albums
Albums with cover art by Doug TenNapel